Emmet Nicholson Thomas (June 10, 1855 - September 15, 1932) was an American politician. He was the speaker of the Mississippi House of Representatives from 1904 to 1908.

Early life and career 
Emmet Nicholson Thomas was born on June 10, 1855, in Gonzales, Texas. He was the son of William Thomas, a probate judge in Texas during the Civil War, and his wife Ann (Rogers) Thomas; both of whom were of Scottish descent. Thomas attended public schools, and he graduated from Mississippi College with a B. A. degree in 1876. Thomas then read law and was admitted to the bar in 1880. He then began practicing law in Washington County, Mississippi.

Political career 
Thomas was elected to represent Washington County as a Democrat in the Mississippi House of Representatives in 1889. He was re-elected in 1895, 1899, and 1903. On June 3, 1903, he officiated at the laying of the cornerstone of Mississippi's new State Capitol. On January 5, 1904, Thomas was elected by the other representatives to be the office of the Speaker of the House.

Later life 
Thomas died on September 15, 1932.

Personal life 
Thomas was a Presbyterian. He was a Grand Master of the Masonic Grand Lodge of Mississippi. In 1884, he married Martha H. Shackleford; they had three children together.

References 

1855 births
1932 deaths
Speakers of the Mississippi House of Representatives
Democratic Party members of the Mississippi House of Representatives
Place of death missing
People from Greenville, Mississippi
People from Gonzales, Texas
19th-century American politicians
20th-century American politicians
American Presbyterians
American people of Scottish descent
Mississippi College alumni